Toyota Motor Philippines Corporation (TMP) is a subsidiary of Toyota, based in Santa Rosa, Laguna, Philippines, responsible for the assembly and distribution of Toyota vehicles in the Philippines since 1988. The company was established on August 3, 1988, as a joint venture between Toyota, Mitsui & Co and GT Capital.

TMPC is the largest automotive company in the country, with the widest vehicle line-up of 21 models and a sales distribution and service network composed of 63 dealerships nationwide. Its main production facility, the 82-hectare Toyota Special Economic Zone (TSEZ), is located in Santa Rosa, Laguna for assembling cars. TMPC is also the provider of financial services unit, Toyota Financial Services Philippines, and Lexus Manila, Inc., the official distributor of Lexus cars.

History

Toyota's presence in the Philippines dates back to 1962 when Delta Motor Corporation, a company established by Ricardo C. Silverio Sr., acquired the rights to assemble and distribute Toyota vehicles for the Philippine market. Delta Motor Corporation collapsed during the Philippine economic downturn in the early 1980s. Operations came to a halt in December 1983 and by March 1984, Toyota's tie-up with Delta Motor Corporation was terminated. The company was dissolved by 1988.

When Toyota Motor Corporation president Shoichiro Toyoda came looking for a new partner in the Philippines, he sought out Dr. George S. K. Ty, and on August 3, 1988, TMPC was incorporated as a joint-venture among Metrobank, Toyota Motor Corporation and Mitsui & Co.

In 1994, TMPC captured its first "Triple Crown": No.1 in Total Sales, Passenger Car Sales and Commercial Vehicle Sales. It has continued its Triple Crown run up to the present, garnering 19 consecutive Triple Crowns as of 2019.

In April 1997, TMPC opened its Sta. Rosa Assembly Plant complementing the operations at the Bicutan Assembly Plant (formerly, the Delta Motor Corporation assembly plant). In 2003, TMPC's Sta. Rosa Industrial Complex is certified as an economic zone by the Philippine Economic Zone Authority.

The Bicutan Assembly Plant was closed in 2005 and all production was moved to Santa Rosa, Laguna. The old plant became Toyota Bicutan Parañaque built fronting the Bicutan exit of Metro Manila Skyway.

Models

Manufactured locally 
Toyota Innova
Toyota Vios

Imported 
Toyota Alphard
Toyota Avanza
Toyota Camry
Toyota Coaster
Toyota Corolla Altis
Toyota Corolla Cross
Toyota FJ Cruiser
Toyota Fortuner
Toyota GR Supra
Toyota GR Yaris
Toyota Hiace Cargo and Commuter
Toyota Hiace
Toyota Hilux
Toyota Land Cruiser
Toyota Land Cruiser Prado
Toyota LiteAce
Toyota Prius
Toyota Raize
Toyota RAV4
Toyota Rush
Toyota Veloz
Toyota Wigo
Toyota Yaris
Toyota 86

Former

Manufactured locally
Toyota Corolla (1988–2001)
Toyota Corona (1991–1999)
Toyota Tamaraw FX (1990–2002)
Toyota LiteAce (Van) (1989–1999)
Toyota Revo (1998–2005)

Imported
Toyota Prius C (2012–2018)
Toyota Previa (2006–2017)
Toyota Crown (1988–1999)
Toyota Echo (2000–2003)
Toyota Echo Verso (2000–2003)

References

External links
Toyota Motor Philippines Corporation

Toyota factories
Motor vehicle manufacturers of the Philippines
Motor vehicle assembly plants in the Philippines
Toyota subsidiaries
Companies based in Santa Rosa, Laguna
1988 establishments in the Philippines
Philippine subsidiaries of foreign companies
Vehicle manufacturing companies established in 1988